WDNL (102.1 FM, "D102") is a radio station broadcasting a Hot AC format. Licensed to Danville, Illinois, the station serves East-Central Illinois and West-Central Indiana, and is owned by Neuhoff Corp., through licensee Neuhoff Media Danville, LLC.

References

External links
WDNL's official website
Neuhoff Media Station Guide

DNL